The Best of Pavlov's Dog is a compilation album by American progressive rock/AOR band Pavlov's Dog, released in 1995.

It compiles songs from the band's first two albums, Pampered Menial (1975) and At the Sound of the Bell (1976). The album's liner notes give credit to all eight 1973-1976 Pavlov's Dog full-time members for their contributions, but they do not mention the session and guest musicians who also took part in the At the Sound of the Bell recordings.

The album's front cover is a blue colored snippet from Edwin Landseer's painting High Life which was also used in the original back cover of Pampered Menial.

Track listing
All tracks credited to David Surkamp, except where noted.

Personnel
See Pampered Menial personnel and At the Sound of the Bell personnel accordingly

References

1995 compilation albums
Pavlov's Dog (band) albums